Fass may refer to:
 Fass 57 (SIG 510), a battle rifle
 FASS 90 (SIG 550), an assault rifle

Fass or Faß is the surname of:
 John Fass, American graphic designer 
 Baddon Fass, a fictional character in Dark Empire and Dark Empire II
 Bob Fass (1933–2021), American radio personality
 Frederick Fass (1853–1930), American baseball player
 George Fass and Gertrude Fass, see 77 Sunset Strip
 Myron Fass, 1970s magazine entrepreneur
 Patricia Fass Palmer, producer of The Powers That Be

FASS may also refer to:
 FASS curve, a curve in mathematical analysis which is space-filling, self-avoiding, simple and self-similar
 FASS (drug formulary), Farmaceutiska Specialiteter i Sverige, the Swedish national formulary of drugs
Friends of Assam and Seven Sisters, an international non-profit NGO - see Assamese Associations
FASS, a University of Waterloo theater group

See also 
 Fas (disambiguation)
 Heidelberg Tun (Großes Fass von Heidelberg)